Kentucky Route 556 (KY 556) is a  state highway in Elliott County, Kentucky that runs from Kentucky Route 173 at Lytten to Kentucky Route 7 and Court Street in downtown Sandy Hook via Bigstone.

Major intersections

References

0556
Transportation in Elliott County, Kentucky